The Rising Son (1896 - 1918) was a weekly newspaper published in Kansas City, Missouri. It served African Americans and covered local and national news. Lewis Wood edited it. It was purchased from Henry R. Graham by William T. Washington, a newspaperman with political aspirations, who used it to promote his career and an intense rivalry with Nelson C. Crews' Kansas City Sun newspaper developed.

References

Defunct newspapers published in Missouri
Defunct weekly newspapers
Publications established in 1896
Publications disestablished in 1918
Mass media in the Kansas City metropolitan area